Hebius atemporalis is a species of snake of the family Colubridae. It is also known as the mountain keelback or Tonkin keelback.

Geographic range
The snake is found in northern Vietnam, Laos, and southern China including Hong Kong.

References 

atemporalis
Snakes of China
Reptiles of Hong Kong
Reptiles of Laos
Snakes of Vietnam
Taxa named by René Léon Bourret
Reptiles described in 1934
Taxobox binomials not recognized by IUCN